Colonel Edward Hill (died c.1662) was a Virginia planter, soldier and politician. In addition to representing Charles City County for many terms in the House of Burgesses, fellow members three times selected him as its Speaker (1644–45, 1654–55, and 1659). Burgesses also sent Hill to Maryland to put down Richard Ingle's 1646 rebellion, and he acted as that colony's temporary governor before ceding to the proper governor, Leonard Calvert, but later contested nonpayment of monies promised to him and Virginia militia troops for that action. He also led the Charles County and Henrico County militia and Pamunkey native Americans against other tribes in Hanover County in 1656, with less success.

Early and family life
This man's origins are uncertain. Although some speculation considers him the son of "Master Edward Hill" of Elizabeth City County who distinguished himself defending his home (and 100 acres of farmed land) against Native Americans in the uprising of 1622, and who was buried on May 15, 1624. That Edward Hill's widow, the former Hannah Boyle (1602-after 1644), remarried twice while remaining in Elizabeth City and raising that man's daughter named Elizabeth. If that man had a son, he would have inherited the property by primogeniture, and appeared in the 1625 muster, but didn't. Hannah's second husband, Thomas Spellman, helped settle her first husband's estate, but died by March 1627, leaving his property in England to their daughter Mary and his Virginia property to his widow. Her third husband, Alexander Mountney (an "ancient planter" who had arrived in the colony in 1610 and had moved to Accomack County by 1635), sold the girls' lands in Elizabeth City and converted the proceeds to cattle, among other court appearances before his death in February 1644.

Career
Hill established Shirley Plantation in Charles City County by 1638. Two years later he was a tobacco viewer for Charles City County, and 1660 he patented nearly 2500 acres in Charles City County which became part of Shirley plantation.

In 1640, Hill first represented Charles City County in the House of Burgesses, alongside Francis Eppes, Joseph Johnson and Thomas Pawlett. In that session, as with previous sessions, the assembly had a clerk (Richard Lee) but no Speaker. Hill continued to represent Charles City County in the House of Burgesses in 1642, this time alongside Walter Aston and Walter Chiles, as well as Joseph Johnson. However, he was not among the county's three representatives (Walter Aston, Walter Chiles and Thomas Stegg) in 1643, when burgesses elected Thomas Stegg as the legislature's first Speaker. In 1644, Hill succeeded Stegg as the Speaker. At that 1644 assembly, Hill represented Charles City County alongside John Bishop, Francis Poythres and John Westropp, and the following year continued as Speaker, but represented the county alongside Rice Hooe, Francis Poythress and Edward Prince. The Grand Assembly of 1645-1646 did not re-elect Hill as Speaker, instead selecting Edmund Scarborough, although Hill did represent Charles City County, this time alongside Francis Eppes, Rice Hooe, Edward Prince, William Barker, Charles Sparrow and Anthony Wyatt. In 1646, Hill was not one of Charles City County's two representatives in the House of Burgesses (they being Rice Hooe, and Daniel Lluellin), presumably because of his activities in Maryland described below.

In March 1645, the assembly ordered Captain Hill and Captain Charles Willoughby to take troops to Maryland to capture and return some Virginians who remained there without permission. While there, Hill acted as Maryland's governor, and he remained in Maryland and in that office for several months. He had a commission dated July 30, 1646 which had a signature purportedly of Gov. Charles Calvert, but without proof that the governor actually signed it. On January 18, 1646, Hill wrote Leonard Calvert from Northumberland County (on Virginia's Eastern Shore) requesting "sallary in that unhappy service", and Maryland Governor Thomas Green replied that Hill's demands should be satisfied. By the year's end, Governor Calvert, in command of a small body of troops, recaptured the Maryland capitol in Annapolis and reinstated himself in the government, which prompted Hill to surrender and return to Virginia. Nonetheless, Calvert died, prompting the executor of his estate, Lady Margaret Brent to liquidate part of his estate to secure the departure of Hill and his troops. Thus in August 1647, Mr. Broadhurst declared "there is now no governor in Maryland, for Captain Hill is governor, and him only he acknowledged." Captain Hill attended a meeting of the Maryland governor's council on June 10, 1648, and demanded payment of the money promised him by Leonard Calvert as governor, namely half of the Governor's receipts for 1646, as well as half the customs duties collected that year. On August 26, 1649, Lord Baltimore responded by declaring that in 1646 Hill was only his pretended lieutenant in that province and that Lord Baltimore had never fully authorized that payment.

In 1649, Hill then resumed his seat in the House of Burgesses, again representing Charles City County, this time alongside Charles Sparrow. Burgesses elected Thomas Harwood as their Speaker and John Corker as their clerk, since former clerk John Carter was representing "Nansimum" county in that assembly.  However, in 1650 the Virginia Governor's Council summoned Hill to explain the authority under which he had collected fifty men to accompany him on an expedition to land west of the fall line of either the James, Rappahannock, or Potomac river, "with the avowed intention of finding gold or silver in these parts." The next assembly at which Charles City County was represented was from April 26 til May 6, 1652, and Hill not only represented the county alongside John Bushopp, but again became its Speaker, with John Corker continuing as clerk. However, Hill's election as Speaker prompted former Henrico burgess William Hatcher to complain to the Governor and Council that Hill was an atheist and blasphemer, since similar charges in the Quarter Court had been dismissed. Not only did the burgesses clear Hill of that charge, they forced Hatcher to on bended knee before the bar of the House to acknowledge his offense against Hill and the Burgesses, similar to the practice in the House of Commons. In late 1654, Hill again not only represented Charles City County (alongside Stephen Hamlin, Henry Perry and Abraham Wood), but the Burgesses again elected him Speaker, this time with Charles Norwood elected as the clerk. On March 31, 1654, Hill had also begun serving on the governor's advisory council (normally a lifetime appointment, to what later became the legislature's upper house).

About a year later, in March 1755, the Governor's Council ordered that Hill be given command of at least 100 men and sent to remove some 600 or 700 native Americans from the colony's west and inland regions, particularly those who had traveled down from the mountains the previous year and settled near the falls of the James River (which later became the city of Richmond, Virginia). Hill then became commander in chief of the militias of Henrico and Charles City Counties, and led a force of 100 colonists and 100 Pamunkey native Americans (mostly from what became New Kent County). The military action became the last of the great battles between the Eastern Siouan and the Algonquian-speaking native peoples. One of the many Native American casualties when Hill removed his troops from the battlefield was Tottopottomoy, the chief of his Pamunkey allies. The burgesses demanded a report from Colonel Hill, and suspended him from all civil and military offices pending investigation. However, authorities seemed satisfied with his response, for in April 1658 Hill again sat on the Governor's Council and in March 1659 again became Speaker of the House of Burgesses, as well as one of the two members representing Charles City County (the other being Warham Horsmenden).

Personal life
Hill married and had children, although as with his birth origin, the identity of his wife and most children is unproven. He clearly was the father of son Edward Hill, Jr., who inherited Shirley plantation, as well as married and had children, including Edward Hill III who like his father and grandfather served as a burgess and lived at Shirley plantation. On August 5, 1658, an Edward Hill and his wife Elizabeth conveyed a lot in Jamestown (the colonial capital, where members of the Council were supposed to have living space) to Walter Chiles II. This original Edward Hill may have married or remarried a woman originally named Hannah Jordan (widow of burgess Walter Aston who had represented Shirley Hundred Island or related entities most years between 1630 and 1643; Aston or a namesake son died in 1656). Edward and Hannah Hill may also have had a son named Thomas and daughters Hannah and Mary since several people with the Hill surname lived in Charles City County before 1700. In the winter of 1661/2, Edward Hill Jr. had a land/dower dispute with his mother or stepmother Hannah Hill, which indicates his father's death, and an October 1663 court notation indicated she was too ill to appear in court or surrender the land.

Death and legacy
Hill died, probably in what we now consider the early months of 1662, although his place of death and burial have been lost. In 1663 he was (finally) paid for procuring powder and shot for the colony. His son, Edward Hill, Jr. continued both the family's political involvement representing Charles City County in the House of Burgesses, and served one term as its Speaker, as well as cultivated Shirley Plantation and other vast landed estates.

Shirley Plantation remains today, as one of the Commonwealth's longest operating plantations, and is on the National Register of Historic Places. Upper Shirley Vineyard, immediately adjacent to the plantation house, on what had been the same property during Edward Hill's lifetime (and that of many of his descendants) has tasting rooms open to the public, including on days that the plantation house is closed to the public.
Cockacoeske, Totopotomoy's widow, reminded the Virginia General Assembly of her husband's death in 1676 when they again requested assistance during Bacon's Rebellion. The National Park Service administers a battlefield named "Totopotomoy Creek" near Mechanicsville on the outskirts of Richmond, but as the site of a battle in May 1864, not 1656.

References

1662 deaths
Speakers of the Virginia House of Burgesses
House of Burgesses members
People from Charles City County, Virginia
Year of birth unknown